Switched at Birth is an American teen and family drama television series that premiered on ABC Family on June 6, 2011. The one-hour scripted drama is set in the Kansas City metropolitan area, and revolves around two teenagers who were switched at birth and grew up in very different environments: one in an affluent suburb, and the other in a working-class neighborhood. According to ABC Family, it is "the first mainstream television series to have multiple deaf and hard-of-hearing series regulars and scenes shot entirely in American Sign Language (ASL)".

The show's debut was ABC Family's highest-rated series debut to date. The series won an honorary Peabody Award in 2013, and on July 30, ABC Family ordered a third season which premiered on January 13, 2014. On August 13, 2014, ABC Family renewed the series for a fourth season, which premiered on January 6, 2015.

On October 21, 2015, ABC Family (later rebranded as Freeform) confirmed the series had been renewed for its fifth season, which was later confirmed to be the final season. On March 19, 2016, it was announced that the fifth season was bumped from a March 2016 to a January 2017 premiere date. In October 2016, the network announced that the final season would premiere on January 31, 2017.

Plot

Bay Kennish, a teenage girl living in the Kansas City suburb of Mission Hills, Kansas, discovers from a school lab assignment that her blood type is incompatible with that of her parents. Genetic testing confirms Bay is not the Kennishes' biological daughter. It is revealed that the hospital mistakenly switched Bay at birth with Daphne, who has been raised by her single mother Regina and grandmother Adriana in the low-income neighborhood of East Riverside, Missouri. Daphne is deaf, having lost her hearing as a result of contracting meningitis at age three. The Kennishes invite Daphne and Regina to their home, and after learning that Regina is struggling financially, propose that they move into their guest house with Adriana, an offer that Regina accepts.

This arrangement forces the girls, along with both families, to understand their differences and embrace their similarities. The girls sometimes struggle with their identities. Bay discovers that she has inherited her artistic talent from Regina, and Daphne discovers she has inherited John's athletic skill and Kathryn's love of cooking. Both mothers learn to bond with their biological daughters, while often unintentionally angering the ones they raised. John learns to relate to his new-found daughter by coaching her deaf school's basketball team and employing her in the office of one of the local chain of car washes that he owns. Bay is driven by a need to find her biological father, Angelo Sorrento, who left Regina shortly after Daphne went deaf.

Cast

Main characters

 Sean Berdy as Emmett Bledsoe (regular season 1–4, recurring season 5), Daphne's best friend who is also deaf. He later dates Bay.
 Lucas Grabeel as Toby Kennish: Bay and Daphne's older brother.
 Katie Leclerc as Daphne Paloma Vasquez: the biological daughter of John and Kathryn Kennish. Hard of hearing rather than deaf, Leclerc learned ASL at age 17, before she was diagnosed at age 20 with Ménière's disease which runs in her family. She developed a deaf accent for her role as Daphne, but speaks without it briefly in a scene in season 1, episode 9 where Daphne dreams the switch never occurred, and she was raised as Bay Kennish and retains her hearing. She also speaks without the accent through almost the entire episode 15 of season 2, "Ecce Mono", which is an alternative reality in which Daphne was raised by the Kennishes from age three and got a cochlear implant.
 Vanessa Marano as Bay Madeline Kennish: the biological daughter of Regina Vasquez and Angelo Sorrento. She was raised in the wealthy neighborhood of Mission Hills by John and Kathryn Kennish. Bay is a very talented artist who has a particular love for Frida Kahlo. Bay can be very impulsive at times, and, at first, does not take the news of the switch well. However, she gradually gets better in accepting that Regina and the Kennishes are both her family.
 Constance Marie as Regina Vasquez: Bay's biological mother and Daphne's legal mother.
 D. W. Moffett as John Kennish: Bay's legal father and Daphne's biological father.
 Lea Thompson as Kathryn Kennish: Bay's legal mother and Daphne's biological mother.
 Gilles Marini as Angelo Sorrento (recurring season 1, regular season 2–3): Bay's biological father and Daphne's legal father.

Recurring characters
Marlee Matlin as Melody Bledsoe, Emmett's mother and Regina's friend who is also deaf.
Ivonne Coll as Adriana Vasquez, Regina's mother. It is a running gag on the show that Adriana likes to watch telenovelas, and she quips that they cannot compete with the real-life drama caused by Angelo.
Austin Butler as Wilke, Toby's best friend who also dates Daphne briefly.
Maiara Walsh as Simone Sinclair, Bay's nemesis and Toby's ex-girlfriend, as well as Wilkie's ex-girlfriend
Blair Redford as Ty Mendoza, Bay's ex-boyfriend and Regina and Daphne's friend from their old neighborhood
Charles Michael Davis as Liam Lupo, Bay and Daphne's ex-boyfriend
B. K. Cannon as Mary Beth, Bay's and Ty's friend and Travis' ex-girlfriend
Anthony Natale as Cameron Bledsoe, Emmett's father
TL Forsberg as Olivia, Cameron Bledsoe's stoner ex-girlfriend
Christopher Wiehl as Patrick, Regina's ex-boyfriend
Tania Raymonde as Zarra, Bay's rebellious friend
Justin Bruening as Chef Jeff Reycraft, Daphne's boss and short-term boyfriend
Ryan Lane as Travis Barnes, Daphne's deaf friend. Lane's role as Travis earned him the RJ Mitte Diversity Award at the 2013 Media Access Awards. He is Bay's boyfriend in the final season.
Max Lloyd-Jones as Noah, Bay's hard-of-hearing friend (and short-term boyfriend). The character parallels the real-life situation of Katie Leclerc, with hearing loss due to inherited Ménière's disease.
Annie Ilonzeh as Lana, the mother of Angelo's second child
Cassi Thomson as Nikki Papagus (Kennish), Toby's ex-wife
Stephanie Nogueras as Natalie Pierce, a Carlton student who becomes Bay's friend
Max Adler as Miles "Tank" Conroy, Bay's ex-boyfriend and Toby's former roommate
Alec Mapa as Renzo, Kathryn's friend who she meets while taking tap-dancing classes
RJ Mitte as Campbell Bingman, a pre-med student, wheelchair user and volunteer at the free clinic where Daphne is serving her hours of community service. He briefly dates Daphne.
David Castaneda as Jorge, Daphne's ex-boyfriend 
Bianca Bethune as Sharee, Daphne's friend and field hockey teammate from Carlton 
Sharon Pierre-Louis as Iris, Daphne's hearing and signing college roommate and cousin of her pre-med interpreter 
Adam Hagenbuch as Greg "Mingo" Shimingo, Daphne's college boyfriend and son of John's former business manager
Nyle DiMarco as Garrett Banducci, a Carlton student and co-worker of Travis' who takes a romantic interest in Bay. He is also deaf.
Daniel Durant as Matthew, a deaf boy who tries to frame hearing students at school. He is also revealed as gay and has a romantic interest in Emmett.
Rachel Shenton as Lily Summers, a neighbour who becomes pregnant with Toby's baby.
Alice Lee as Skye.
Kenneth Mitchell as Wes, Regina's boss.

Guest stars
Meredith Baxter appears in season 1 and 4 as Kathryn's mother Bonnie, a co-investor in John's car wash business, whose favor shifts from Bay to Daphne upon learning of the switch.
Corbin Bernsen appears in season 1 as Wilkie's father, James Wilkes Jr., who has the unpleasant task of telling Daphne he is sending his troubled son to boarding school.
Shelley Long appears in season 1 as Rya Bellows, a publisher who encourages Kathryn to write her own memoir of the switch.
Terrell Tilford as Eric, opened the coffee shop and Regina is now a partner of. The two of them are also in a relationship. Eric has a young son and mysterious past.
Sandra Bernhard as Teresa Ledarsky, Bay's art teacher in Season 3.
Davi Santos appears in Season 3, Episode 12: Love Among the Ruins as Martin, Nacho's friend.
Sam Adegoke appears in Season 5, as Chris Walker.

Production
On August 1, 2011, ABC Family announced that they were ordering more episodes for the first season of Switched at Birth, bringing the first season to a total of 30 episodes. After the airing of the series' initial 10 episodes ended on August 8, 2011, the series continued with a winter premiere on January 3, 2012, airing an additional 12 episodes through March 20, 2012. The series began airing the remaining 8 episodes of its first season on September 3, 2012. On July 30, 2013, ABC Family renewed the show for a third season to premiere on January 13, 2014.

The show has an American Sign Language expert who helps make sure that the sign language used by the four fluent regulars (Katie Leclerc, Sean Berdy, Constance Marie, and Marlee Matlin) all employ a similar dialect.

Airing on March 4, 2013, to mark the 25th anniversary of the "Deaf President Now" protests at Gallaudet University, the season 2 episode "Uprising"—which featured a similar student-led protest surrounding the closure of Carlton School for the Deaf, was produced almost entirely in sign language.

Filming locations
The show was filmed in Los Angeles, California. Establishing shots used in several episodes feature video of downtown Kansas City, Missouri, including: a shot of the Liberty Memorial in the first episode; the Kemper Museum of Contemporary Art; and Loose Park. Scenes were filmed in Santa Clarita, Valencia, Beverly Hills, and Pasadena.

Marketing 
ABC Family promoted the series by launching an online game, Switched at Birth: Hunt for the Code one week before the premiere. Bay, a graffiti artist, left her signature stencil image on ten different websites, and players searched for the picture and accompanying code to redeem sneak peeks and enter a drawing to win $4,000. Each weekday, ABCFamily.com posted two clues hinting at a site featuring the image, and instructed users to scan the code with a Microsoft Tag Reader for exclusive content. Additionally, each code had two letters for fans to collect and enter to win upon completion of the ten-digit code.

Broadcast

Reception

Critical reception 
On the review aggregator website Rotten Tomatoes, the first season holds an approval rating of 100% based on 6 reviews, with an average rating of 7.50/10. The site's critics consensus reads, "Despite leaning on a tried-and-true premise, Switched at Birth proves to be an entertaining remix thanks to fresh writing and charming characters." On Metacritic, the first season of the show holds a score of 75 out of 100 based on reviews from 5 critics, indicating "generally favorable reviews."

On the review aggregator website Rotten Tomatoes, the second season holds an approval rating of 100% based on 5 reviews, with an average rating of 8.50/10.

Ratings
The show's premiere on the ABC Family network was the highest-rated ever, with 3.3million viewers. The total, including the first episode's repeat later that evening, was an estimated 4.9million.

Accolades

See also
 Switched at Birth, 1991 film
 Switched at Birth, 1999 film
 Paramparça, 2014–17 TV series

References

External links

ABC Spark website

 
2011 American television series debuts
2017 American television series endings
2010s American college television series
2010s American high school television series
2010s American teen drama television series
ABC Family original programming
Freeform (TV channel) original programming
English-language television shows
Sign language television shows
Television series about families
Television series about teenagers
Television shows filmed in Los Angeles
Television shows set in Kansas
Television shows set in Missouri
Television series by Disney–ABC Domestic Television
Discrimination in fiction